Mike Puru (born 20 August 1975) is a New Zealand TV host and former radio DJ. While previously working at radio station The Edge from 1995 until 2015, Puru then hosted the first two seasons of The Bachelor New Zealand on Three. Along with Mel Homer, he co-hosted the morning television show The Cafe from 2016 until May 2020.

Mike also hosts the afternoon show on The Hits radio station with Stacey Morrison and Anika Moa.

Early life 
On 20 August 1975, Mike Puru was born in Gore, New Zealand. His family lived in the small town of Waikoikoi, New Zealand until he was nine years old. Puru attended St Peter's College in Gore from 1987 to 1993.

Early career and education 
Puru started working in radio and television after he finished high school in 1993. Puru set up an hour-long radio show for St Peter's College to present weekly events from Invercargill.

Mike also had involvement with the Gore Operatic Society and he played the lead role in West Otago Theatrical Society production of Joseph.

During his final year at St Peter's College, Puru became head boy, and then left to pursue his career in radio and television by attending NZ Broadcasting School. He later moved to Hamilton for seven years and then to Auckland.

Career 
From 1995 until 2015, Puru was one of the radio DJs for the New Zealand radio station The Edge.

In October 2012, he became one of the inaugural TV presenters on New Zealand's first, but short-lived Yesshop home shopping channel. A career highlight included interviewing Eva Longoria live on air during the Hollywood star's brief first visit to New Zealand as a guest of The Shopping Channel.

On 7 December 2015, Puru announced he was leaving The Edge, and did so officially on 11 December. He was replaced by Clinton Randell and the station's breakfast show was renamed The Jay-Jay, Dom & Randell Show.

In 2016 Puru continued as host for the second season of The Bachelor, but was not selected to host its third season.
He was co-host of Three's morning show The Cafe from 2016 until May 2020.

Puru became a host of The Hits along with Stacey Morrison in 2019. Anika Moa joined the show later in 2019.

Personal life 
Puru came out on air as gay in 2010, and shortly after he announced his engagement to his partner of eight years. However, in May 2012 he confirmed the relationship was over.

See also 
 List of New Zealand television personalities

References 

1975 births
Living people
New Zealand LGBT broadcasters
New Zealand television presenters
New Zealand radio presenters
New Zealand gay men
People from Gore, New Zealand
The Edge (radio station)
People educated at St Peter's College, Gore